Agoseris monticola is a North American species of flowering plants in the family Asteraceae known by the common name Sierra Nevada agoseris or Sierra Nevada mountain dandelion. It grows in the mountains of the western United States, primarily the Cascade Range and Sierra Nevada, but also on other mountains in Nevada and Idaho.

Description
Agoseris monticola resembles  the common dandelion (Taraxacum officinale) in having no leafy stems, only a rosette of leaves close to the ground. There is a single flower head with many yellow ray florets but no disc florets.

References

External links
Calphotos photos gallery, University of California, Agoseris monticola
Flora of Eastern Washington and Adjacent Idaho
Paul Slichter,  Mountain Agoseris, Pale Agoseris, Sierra Nevada Agoseris Agoseris monticola

monticola
Flora of California
Flora of Nevada
Flora of the Northwestern United States
Flora of the Sierra Nevada (United States)
Taxa named by Edward Lee Greene
Plants described in 1899
Flora without expected TNC conservation status